"Two Step" is a song by American rock group Dave Matthews Band. It was released in January 1997 as the fourth single from their album Crash. It has appeared on multiple live albums including Live at Red Rocks 8.15.95, The Best of What's Around Vol. 1, and The Central Park Concert.

Track listing
"Two Step" (Edit) — 3:53
"Two Step" (Acoustic) — 6:26
"Crash into Me" (Acoustic) — 5:18
"Typical Situation" (Acoustic) — 6:20
"So Much to Say" (Acoustic) — 3:44
"Two Step" (Album Version) — 6:26

Charts

References

Dave Matthews Band songs
1997 singles
Songs written by Dave Matthews
Song recordings produced by Steve Lillywhite
1996 songs
RCA Records singles